was a B1 type (I-15-class) submarine of the Imperial Japanese Navy that served in World War II, took part in the Attack on Pearl Harbor, and was the only Axis submarine to carry out aerial bombing on the continental United States in World War II, during the so-called Lookout Air Raids, and the shelling of Fort Stevens, both attacks occurring in the state of Oregon.

She carried a two-seater Yokosuka E14Y reconnaissance floatplane, known to the Allies as "Glen". It was disassembled and stowed in a hangar in front of the conning tower.

First patrol
In World War II, I-25 served under the command of Lieutenant Commander Akiji Tagami who had graduated from Class 51 at Etajima, Hiroshima. 26-year-old Lieutenant Tatsuo Tsukudo was the executive officer(XO) on I-25.  I-25 departed Yokosuka on 21 November 1941 in preparation for hostilities.

After the Japanese aircraft carriers sailed west following the attack, I-25 and eight other submarines sailed eastwards to patrol the west coast of the United States. I-25 patrolled off the mouth of the Columbia River. A scheduled shelling of American coastal cities on Christmas eve of 1941 was canceled because of the frequency of coastal air and surface patrols.

The damaged tanker managed to escape but ran aground at the mouth of the Columbia River. I-25 then returned to Kwajalein, arriving on 11 January 1942 to refuel and be refurbished.

Second patrol
I-25 left Kwajalein atoll in the Marshall Islands on 5 February for its next operational patrol in the south Pacific. Tagami's orders were to reconnoitre the Australian harbours of Sydney, Melbourne and Hobart followed by the New Zealand harbours of Wellington and Auckland.

I-25 travelled on the surface for nine days, but as she approached the Australian coastline, she only travelled on the surface under the cover of night.

On Saturday 14 February, I-25 was within a few miles of the coast near Sydney. The searchlights in Sydney could clearly be seen from the bridge of I-25.

A number of days of rough swell prevented an immediate launch of the "Glen" floatplane. They stayed submerged during the day and went back to the surface at night. Finally on Tuesday, 17 February, Warrant Flying Officer Nobuo Fujita took off in the "Glen" for a reconnaissance flight over Sydney Harbour. The purpose was to look at Sydney's airbase. By 0730, Fujita had returned to I-25 and disassembled the "Glen" and stowed it in the watertight hangar.

Their next mission was a similar flight over Melbourne. Tagami decided to launch the aircraft from Cape Wickham at the northern end of King Island at the western end of Bass Strait about halfway between Victoria and Tasmania. The floatplane was launched on 26 February for its reconnaissance flight to Melbourne over Port Phillip Bay.

Fujita's next reconnaissance flight in Australia was over Hobart on 1 March. I-25 then headed for New Zealand where Fujita flew another reconnaissance flight over Wellington on 8 March. Fujita next flew over Auckland on 13 March, followed by Fiji on 17 March.

I-25 returned to its base at Kwajalein on 31 March and then proceeded to Yokosuka for refit.  I-25 was in Yokosuka drydock number 5 on 18 April 1942 when one of the Doolittle Raid B-25 Mitchell bombers damaged Japanese aircraft carrier Ryūhō in adjacent drydock number 4.

Third patrol
While outbound past the Aleutian Islands for a third war patrol off the west coast of North America, I-25s Glen seaplane overflew United States military installations on Kodiak Island.  The surveillance on 21 May 1942 was in preparation for the northern diversion of the Battle of Midway.

Shortly after midnight on 20 June 1942, I-25 torpedoed the new, coal-burning Canadian freighter SS Fort Camosun off the coast of Washington.  The freighter was bound for England with a cargo of war production materials including zinc, lead, and plywood.  One torpedo struck the port side below the bridge and flooded the 2nd and 3rd cargo holds.  Canadian corvettes  and  reached the stricken freighter after dawn and rescued the crew from lifeboats. Fort Camosun was towed back into Puget Sound for repairs, and later survived a second torpedo attack by I-27 in the Gulf of Aden in the fall of 1943.

On the evening of 21 June 1942, I-25 followed a fleet of fishing vessels to avoid minefields near the mouth of the Columbia River, in Oregon.  I-25 fired seventeen 14-cm (5.5-inch) shells at Battery Russell, a small coastal army installation within Fort Stevens which was later decommissioned. Fort Stevens was equipped with two 10-inch disappearing guns, some 12-inch mortars, 75 mm field guns, .50-caliber machine guns, and associated searchlights, observation posts, and secret radar capability.  Damage was minimal. In fact, the only items of significance damaged on the fort were a baseball backstop and some power and telephone lines.

The incoming shell fire had a highly stimulative effect on the personnel at Battery Russell. Men leaped out of bed, crashing into things in the dark—turning on a light would be unthinkable—as they scrambled to battle stations in their underwear.

"We looked like hell," Capt. Jack R. Wood, commander of the battery, told historian Bert Webber later. "But we were ready to shoot back in a couple of minutes."

But when gunners requested permission to open fire, they were firmly refused. In part, this was because the submarine's location remained uncertain because of difficulties evaluating reports from different observation points; it was, after all,  from shore. Furthermore, authorities later stated they wished to avoid revealing the locations of their guns to what they believed to be a reconnaissance mission. If the guns opened fire, the sub would be able to report back to Tokyo that a fleet of surface ships could simply heave to,  from shore, and pound Battery Russell with impunity, then sail right on into the Columbia—where, among other valuable targets, upstream at Portland, Oregon Shipbuilding Corporation, one of Henry Kaiser's shipyards, was cranking out Liberty ships at a rate of more than one a week. This, obviously, was not something the Navy could take a chance on.

In the end, Battery Russell sat there and absorbed the fire without a single shot in reply. It was a turning point for American coastal artillery, and the failure to respond caused re-evaluation of men and artillery allocated to coastal defense.

Fourth patrol

Following his successful observation flights on the second and third patrols, Warrant Officer Nubuo Fujita was specifically chosen for a special incendiary bombing mission to create forest fires in North America.  I-25 left Yokosuka on 15 August 1942 carrying six  incendiary bombs.  On 9 September, the crew again deployed the "Glen", which dropped two bombs over forest land near Brookings, Oregon. This attack by an enemy airplane was later called the "Lookout Air Raids", and was the only time that the mainland United States was ever bombed by enemy aircraft and the second continental territory to be bombed as such during wartime, after the bombing of Dutch Harbor in Unalaska, Alaska.

Warrant Officer Fujita's mission had been to trigger wildfires across the coast; at the time, the Tillamook Burn incidents of 1933 and 1939 were well known, as was the destruction of the city of Bandon, Oregon by a smaller out-of-control wildfire in 1936. But light winds, wet weather conditions and two quick-acting fire lookouts kept the fires under control. In fact, had the winds been sufficiently brisk to stoke widespread forest fires, the lightweight Glen may have had difficulty navigating through the bad weather. The Hudson carried  general-purpose demolition bombs with delayed fuzes rather than depth charges. The bombs caused minor damage, but quick response by a Coast Guard cutter and three more aircraft caused I-25 to be more cautious on a second bombing raid on 29 September 1942. The Glen seaplane was assembled and launched in pre-dawn darkness using Cape Blanco Light as a reference. The Glen seaplane was again recovered, but I-25 decided not to risk a third flight with the two remaining incendiary bombs. Captain Tagami took I-25 to rest "...on the bottom [of the harbor of Port Orford ] until night time.

The damaged tanker was towed to the mouth of the Columbia River. When its draft was discovered to be too great to reach repair facilities in Portland, Oregon, another tow was arranged to Puget Sound; but the tanker was destroyed on 10 October by a fire of unknown origin during the second tow.

On the evening of 5 October 1942 I-25 torpedoed the Richfield Oil Company tanker Larry Doheny, which sank the next day. Survivors reached Port Orford, Oregon on the evening of 6 October.

I-25 fired its last torpedo at the lead submarine, which sank in 20 seconds with the loss of all hands. I-25 reported sinking a U.S. submarine, but the submarine was actually Soviet L-16 which was sailing with L-15 en route from Vladivostok to the Panama Canal via Unalaska, Alaska, and San Francisco. United States Navy Chief Photographer's Mate Sergi Andreevich Mihailoff of Arcadia, California, was aboard L-16 as a liaison officer and interpreter, and was killed with the remainder of the submarine crew. The United States Navy Western Sea Frontier denied loss of any submarine and withheld information about the Soviet loss because, at the time, the Soviet Union was officially neutral in the war between Japan and the United States.

SS H.M. Storey was bringing fuel oil from Noumea, New Caledonia, in the South Pacific Ocean to Los Angeles. On May 17, 1943, I-25 torpedoed and fired shells at the ship. The attack killed two of the crew; 63 of the crew made it in to the ship's lifeboats before she sank. US destroyer USS Fletcher rescued the crew in the lifeboats and took them to Port Vila Efate, Vanuatu, in the South Pacific.

1942 North American west coast

Loss

Which American ship sank the I-25 (or any of the other IJN submarines in the vicinity) remains unknown.

Notes

Bibliography
 
  
 Jentschura, Hansgeorg; Dieter Jung, Peter Mickel. Warships of the Imperial Japanese Navy, 1869–1945. United States Naval Institute, 1977.  Annapolis, Maryland, USA.  .

 Aviation History article

External links
 Offbeat Oregon History article about I-25's activities off the Oregon coast
 SS Fort Camosun & Japanese submarine I-25
 IJN I-25: Tabular Record of Movement - Revision 7

Type B1 submarines
Ships built by Mitsubishi Heavy Industries
1940 ships
World War II submarines of Japan
Ships of the Aleutian Islands campaign
Japanese submarines lost during World War II
World War II shipwrecks in the Pacific Ocean
Maritime incidents in September 1943